"Run Away" is a song by alternative rock group Live, which was released as a single from their 2003 album, Birds of Pray.

The American release, which was issued only as a single-track radio promo, is a re-recorded version of the song with country music artist Shelby Lynne sharing lead vocals with Ed Kowalczyk.  This version was released on Live's greatest hits album Awake: The Best of Live (2004).   The other worldwide releases contain the original version of the song.

Track listings
All songs by Ed Kowalczyk, except as noted:

Australian and European CD single
"Run Away" – 3:53
"Like I Do" (Live at Vorst Nationaal) (Lyrics: Kowalczyk, Music: Kowalczyk, Dahlheimer, Taylor) – 4:39
"They Stood Up for Love" (Live at Vorst Nationaal) – 5:03
"Heaven" (Video) – 4:03

European CD single 2

European CD single 3

References

Live (band) songs
2004 singles
Songs written by Ed Kowalczyk
2003 songs
Radioactive Records singles